Captain's Peril is a novel by William Shatner, co-written with Judith and Garfield Reeves-Stevens, based upon the television series Star Trek. The novel was released in 2002 in hardcover format. It is the first in the "Totality" trilogy.  The story continues in Captain's Blood and Captain's Glory.

Synopsis
The Dominion War is over. The Federation is at peace. What better time for two legendary starship captains to set aside the demands of duty and simply take some well-deserved time off? But when James T. Kirk and Jean-Luc Picard arrive on Bajor to dive among the ruins of an ancient sunken city, conditions are far from what they had planned. The small group of scientists the captains have joined suddenly find their equipment sabotaged—isolating them from Deep Space Nine and any hope of rescue—as one by one, a murderer stalks them.

Cut off from the people and technology on which they have always depended, Kirk and Picard must rely more than ever on their own skills and abilities, and their growing friendship, to solve the mysterious deaths and protect one of Bajor's greatest living treasures.

At the same time, Kirk finds the events he and Picard struggle with are similar to one of the first challenges he faced as the new captain of the Starship Enterprise, less than six months into his first five-year mission.

Now, with time running out for a dying child trapped in the scientists' camp, and Picard missing after a diving disaster, Kirk must search his memories of the past to relive one of his earliest adventures, propelling him into a harrowing personal journey that reveals the beginning of his path from young Starfleet officer to renowned legend, and the existence of a new and completely unsuspected threat to the existence of all life in the universe

External links

2002 American novels
Novels based on Star Trek: The Original Series
Novels based on Star Trek: The Next Generation
Novels by William Shatner
Novels by Judith and Garfield Reeves-Stevens
Novels set in the 24th century